This is a list of the main characters in the TV series Tru Calling.



Tru Davies

Tru Davies is the show's main character, portrayed by Eliza Dushku.

Childhood 
At the age of only 12 years old, Tru witnessed the murder of her mother, Elise Davies. Later in the series, it is revealed that Carl Neesan (Wade Andrew Williams), the hitman who killed her was hired by Tru's father, Richard. After her mother's demise, Tru, her younger brother Harrison and  older sister Meredith were abandoned by their father and little has been revealed about who raised them from that point on.

Supernatural Power 
Tru possesses the power to relive the current day when a corpse asks for her help to turn back the clock in order to save his/her Life, or help someone whom the corpse affected in some way. Mostly triumphant, Tru has on occasion been unsuccessful in saving lives, sometimes because of the interference of Jack Harper and sometimes because the corpse was not meant to live. On some occasions her power changed. An instance of this was when a group of five corpses all asked for her help at the same time. Other times her day rewound more than once on an already rewound day, as in "The Longest Day" and "Grace". In "The Last Good Day", when a dead woman asked Jack Harper for help, Tru finally discovered what Jack saw when a corpse would ask her for help. She described this as a Dark Feeling which she would never want to experience again.

Good vs. Evil 
Although both can relive days, it has never been said who is evil, Tru or Jack. Jack has always been portrayed as evil, which Jack denies, although at certain times Jack has broken the rules of preserving fate, such as to make Luc die to teach Tru a lesson.
 
While Tru claims that she is saving people who were taken before their time, Jack claims that he is merely preserving fate, and that if Tru saves someone who is meant to die, she creates a ripple effect in fate.

Romantic Relationships 
Mark Evans - Tru's college Professor. After Tru spotted Mark cheating on her with another one of his students, she ended the relationship. When Tru had a party, Mark visited, only to be killed by one of Tru's friends. Tru then saved his life after he asked her for help and have a proper closure of their relationship.
Nick Kelly - A fireman that was killed in a fire but then asked Tru for help. He was killed again in the same fire on his and Tru's first day together, though he did save a little girl that died with him before when he asked Tru for help.
Luc Johnston - Luc is the crime scene photographer that works with Tru. Tru and Luc started dating and fell in love. However, Luc always questioned why Tru would always take off at a moments notice, and he broke up with her, as he felt she was hiding something from him. After Tru finally revealed the truth to him, he refused to believe it. Jack then tricked him into going to a house looking for someone who would "provide clearer answers". Luc was shot and killed.
Jensen Ritchie - Tru's college mate in med school, who was in a serious relationship when they first met. After he breaks up with his girlfriend, him and Tru spend a day together and end up kissing outside her apartment. Then he was killed in a robbery of an antique store where he was buying an old medic case for Tru. When he is brought to the morgue, he never asks for help, but later in the day a different man who was killed asks for Tru's help. On the second day, Tru saves Jensen from being hit by a car driven by the very same victim she had to save that day. Though, Davis and Jack warn her that there is a reason that Jensen did not ask for help. That it is his fate to die in the robbery, and her changing fate will have consequences. We never get to learn those consequences, since the show is cancelled abruptly. According to the writers of the show; because of his near death experience, he starts to become fascinated by death, which leads to him becoming a serial killer.

Davis
 	 
Davis is Tru's supervisor, friend, and confidante at the Morgue. Davis is portrayed by actor Zach Galifianakis. Years ago, Tru's mother tried to warn him of the car accident that was about to happen.  He didn't heed the warning, but Tru's mother flattened his car's tires, thus saving his life, but unable to save his spouse.  Spending years living in regret and guilt, now acts as a mentor to Tru.  He is a fan of Dungeons & Dragons and has been in a relationship with Dr. Carrie Allen who, unbeknownst to Davis, is a mole working for Jack Harper. In season 1, we find out that Davis is his middle name, although we are not told what his first or last name is.

Harrison Davies

Harrison Davies is Tru's younger brother. He and Lindsay were formerly together, however, she broke it off, and married an old friend. Harrison is played by actor Shawn Reaves. In the season 1 finale "Two Weddings and a Funeral", Harrison is shot and killed by the jealous ex-husband of a woman he had just met. His corpse asks Tru for help, but Jack warns her that saving him will cause someone else to have to die to take his place. At the end of the episode, Jack's manipulations cause Luc to get shot instead of Harrison. In season two he works for his father's law firm. His father implies he has plans for him, but as the show was canceled this was never resolved.

Jack Harper

Jack Harper, a counterpart to Tru's character, is introduced mid-first season as a foil and possible love interest. He is there to make sure fate got its way, and introduces a philosophical aspect to Tru's endeavors: should she be saving the lives of people who may have been intended to die?  Years before his appearance, he works as a paramedic.  While trying  to save a kid during a neighborhood shootout, he was shot on the back and was physically dead for minutes until being revived by his co-worker.  At some point after the event, Jack finds himself reliving days (presumably begins on the same day as Tru) and admits himself to a psych ward believing that he's become insane after a near-death experience until being approached by Tru's father, Richard.  In season one, after Tru prevents the death of her brother, Jack sends Tru's boyfriend Luc to die in his place, and he does. In the second season, Tru and Jack compete to get to a person first — she to save them, and he to restore the order of fate, and maintain what he believes to be the balance of the universe. Sometimes Tru wins, sometimes Jack does. However, when someone asks Jack for help instead of Tru, a girl named Megan, he is unsure of whether he is supposed to make sure she dies, or make sure she lives. He finds out she has a disease and will die regardless, and she only wants to have one final good day before she kills herself so her sister will get money through a foundation. Tru convinces her to postpone that plan, and try to have many more good days first. She decides to do that, and she and Jack go to the place where she died before, a tower from which she had jumped, but this time only so she can look off into the sunset. Jack makes sure she falls off the tower, but he grabs her hand, and she begs for him to save her. In the end, he lets her go, and she falls to her death. Tru arrives in time to only watch her fall and she tells Jack, "I wish that were you" and Jack walks away saying, "That makes two of us." He appeared in the last 7 episodes of the first season, and all of the second season. He works for Tru's father, Richard Davies. Jack is played by actor Jason Priestley.

Lindsay Walker

Lindsay Walker is Tru's best friend in season one. Lindsay and Harrison used to be together, but Lindsay broke it off, and married an old friend. It is assumed that she moved to Europe with her husband after the season one finale, and therefore is not mentioned again. She is played by A. J. Cook. Lindsay appeared in episodes 1-20 (all of season one).

Luc Johnston

Luc Johnston was Tru's first season love interest, who worked as a photographer. Luc was played by Matthew Bomer. He was a series regular from episodes 6-20 in season one. Luc broke things off with Tru over her constant disappearances and strange behavior. In the season 1 finale, Tru rewinds the day to save her brother from being shot by a woman's jealous ex-husband. Luc returns to give her a second chance, but storms off confused and angry when she tries to tell him the truth about her powers. Jack claims that the woman can prove Tru's story, and manipulates Luc into going to her house carrying flowers, causing her ex to shoot him instead of Harrison. He does not ask for help and is buried.

Meredith Davies

Meredith Davies is Tru's sister. She has a drug problem and is in rehab. She is never seen after season one. Meredith is played by Jessica Collins, and was a series regular from episodes 1-13 of season one.

Gardez

Gardez formerly worked at the morgue and is played by Benjamin Benitez. Gardez was a regular on Tru Calling from episodes 4-13 of Tru Calling season one.

Richard Davies

Richard Davies is the father of Tru, Harrison, and Meredith. He formerly had the same 'gift' that Jack Harper now has, and had their mother killed because of it by hiring Carl Neesan (Wade Andrew Williams) as the hitman. Jack Harper works for him, and they both share the same ideology. Richard is played by Cotter Smith. He is credited as Special Guest Star in the second season.

Carrie Allen

Dr. Carrie Allen is Davis's love interest for the second season, and unknown to Davis, works as a mole for Jack.  On the final episode, it is hinted that she knew of Tru's secrets.   She is played by Liz Vassey. She is credited as Special Guest star as well. Had the series continued the character would have developed real feelings for Davis as is hinted in 'Twas the Night Before Christmas...Again'. However he would discover that she had killed her violent and abusive husband and it would then be his dilemma whether to turn her in or not.

Jensen Ritchie

Jensen Ritchie is Tru's second season love interest. In Enough, he is shot and killed, and does not ask for help. Tru then manages to find someone else who asks for help and Tru saves Jensen from this fate on her rewind day. However, Tru is just beginning to learn of the consequences of saving someone who does not ask for help. According to online remarks made by the writers if the second season had continued Jensen would eventually have become so fascinated with mortality as a result of his near death experience that he becomes a serial killer. Eventually Tru has to ask Jack for his help in killing him, letting him die as he was supposed to.  Jensen is played by Eric Christian Olsen. He is also credited as Special Guest Star in season two.

Jensen Ackles was the producer's first choice to play Tru's love interest on the second season. He turned down the role, which was then offered to another actor. The character's name was changed to 'Jensen' because the producers liked Ackles' name.

Avery Bishop

Avery Bishop is one of Tru's medical school friends. She reveals that she and Jensen used to date, but now they are really close friends and simply look out for each other. She is the first to discover Jensen's fiance is a fake. She is played by Lizzy Caplan.

Tyler Li

Tyler Li is another one of Tru's medical school friends. He is played by Parry Shen.

References 

Lists of American drama television series characters
Lists of fantasy television characters
Lists of science fiction television characters